Far on the water is the fifth studio album by the Japanese music group Kalafina on 16 September 2015 under Sony Music Japan label.

Track listing

Usage in media
"heavenly blue": opening theme for anime Aldnoah.Zero
"believe": first ending theme for anime Fate/stay night: Unlimited Blade Works
"ring your bell": second ending theme song for anime Fate/stay night: Unlimited Blade Works
"One Light": second ending theme song for anime The Heroic Legend of Arslan

Charts

References

Kalafina albums
2015 albums
SME Records albums
Japanese-language albums